Kerry Morton is an American professional wrestler currently signed to National Wrestling Alliance (NWA) where he is the current NWA World Junior Heavyweight Champion in his first reign. He is a second-generation professional wrestler, being the son of Ricky Morton. Kerry's grandfather, Paul, was also a professional wrestling referee.

Early life 
Morton attended King University where he started cheerleading at King Tornado.

Professional wrestling career

National Wrestling Alliance (2021–present) 
Morton made his debut in the National Wrestling Alliance (NWA) on December 4, 2021, at the Hard Times 2 pre-show in a NWA World Junior Heavyweight Championship Qualifying Gauntlet match, which was won by Homicide. on the January 22, 2022 episode of NWA USA, which taped on December 3, 2021, where he defeated Jamie Stanley during the quarterfinals of the World Junior Heavyweight Championship tournament. He was later eliminated by Colby Corino. On November 12, at Hard Times 3, Morton defeated Homicide to win the World Junior Heavyweight Championship. On December 14, Morton confirmed that he has signed with NWA. On February 11, 2023, at Nuff Said, Morton successfully defended the title against Alex Taylor.

Championships and accomplishments 
 Innovate Pro Wrestling
 IPW United States Tag Team Championship (1 time) – with JC Addams
 National Wrestling Alliance
 NWA World Junior Heavyweight Championship (1 time, current)
NWA Champions Series Tournament (2023) – with Team Rock N’ Roll (Ricky Morton, Chris Adonis, Taya Valkyrie, Madi Wrenkowski, Jennacide, Mims, Dak Draper and Alex Taylor Willoughby)
 Pro Wrestling Illustrated
 Ranked No. 448 of the top 500 singles wrestlers in the PWI 500 in 2022

References

External links 
 
 
 

21st-century professional wrestlers
American male professional wrestlers
Living people
NWA World Junior Heavyweight Champions
Professional wrestlers from Tennessee
Sportspeople from Tennessee
Year of birth missing (living people)